The Sinan Pasha Mosque is an Ottoman mosque in the city of Prizren, Kosovo. It was built in 1615 by Sofi Sinan Pasha, bey of Budim. The mosque overlooks the main street of Prizren and is a dominant feature in the town's skyline.

Sinan Pasha Mosque was declared a Monument of Culture of Exceptional Importance in 1990 by the Republic of Serbia.

History 

Sofi Sinan Pasha started construction of the mosque in either 1600 or 1608. Sofi Sinan Pasha, an Albanian and former beylerbey and kaymakam in Bosnia should not be confused with grand vizier Sinan Pasha, who built the Sinan Pasha Mosque in the nearby city of Kačanik.

It is widely considered that the stones used to build the mosque were taken from nearby Saint Archangels Monastery, a Serbian Orthodox monastery founded by Serbian Emperor Stefan Dušan. In fact, parts of the former monastery can be seen in the mosque. The monastery, which was abandoned after the arrival of the Ottomans in the 16th century, had fallen to ruins by the 17th century. Hasan Kaleshi, an Albanian historian, sustained in 1972 that Sofi Sinan Pasha couldn't have possibly ordered any monastery destruction as this was impossible without a Sultan decree, rather, he ordered the use of the spare stones to a better deed as ordered by the Sultan.

Description 

It has one large dome and another smaller half-dome that covers the mihrab, which is painted and has a stalactite hood.

The walls and dome inside Sinan Pasha Mosque were painted in the 19th century, mostly of floral patterns and Qur'an verses. The minbar is painted with floral motives. Both the large dome and the half-dome of the mosque are covered with lead. The stone flooring of the mosque and the carpentry are original.

Preservation concerns 
Rain, which over time has entered the mosque via holes in the roof, has caused the loss of some original paintings on the walls and has led to the detachment of some of the wall plaster. Stones of the façade have faced weathering.

Abdullah Gërguri worked on a series of repairs of the murals, particularly in the 1970s.

In early 2000 the cost to rehabilitate the building was estimated at about €500,000 by UNESCO.

Manuscripts and use of building controversy 
The Prizren municipality intended to build a library within the mosque in order to preserve not only the original Ottoman manuscripts found in the mosque, but also other valuable ones that can be found all over Kosovo. However, the Islamic Union of Kosovo filed a lawsuit against the Prizren Municipality in order to not allow the mosque to become a museum, but instead to have it continue to be a religious building.

See also 
List of mosques in Kosovo

Notes

References 

Mosques in Prizren
Ottoman mosques in Kosovo
Religious buildings and structures completed in 1615
1615 establishments in the Ottoman Empire
17th-century mosques
Cultural Monuments of Exceptional Importance (Serbia)
Monuments and memorials in Kosovo
Cultural heritage monuments in Prizren District